Kırıklar can refer to:

 Kırıklar, Aydın
 Kırıklar, Yenice